Rural West Constituency was a constituency represented in the Legislative Council of Singapore from 1948 until 1951. It elected one Legislative Council member.

The constituency was formed in 1948 and cover the areas of Bajau, Bukit Batok, Bukit Panjang, Bukit Timah, Choa Chu Kang, Clementi, Jurong, Kranji, Lim Chu Kang, Mandai, Pandan, Pasir Panjang, Peng Kang, Seletar, Sembawang, Tuas, Ulu Kalang, Ulu Pandan, Woodlands, Yishun. In 1951, the constituency was abolished and split into Bukit Timah and Seletar constituencies.

Legislative Council member

Elections

Elections in the 1940s

References 

Singaporean electoral divisions